The San Diego Metropolitan Transit System (MTS) operates 97 bus routes in San Diego and the rest of the southern half of San Diego County, .

There are 85 "MTS Bus" fixed-route services, nine "Rapid" bus rapid transit routes, and the "MTS Access" paratransit service.

Routes are operated by private contractors and by the San Diego Transit Corporation (SDTC), a subsidiary of the MTS. The SDTC operates 27 routes based out of Downtown San Diego (Imperial Avenue Division), Transdev operates 52 routes based out of Chula Vista (South Bay Division) and El Cajon (East County Division),[18] while First Transit operates the "MTS Access" paratransit service and 21 fixed-route services that are operated with mini-buses based out of Kearny Mesa (Copley Park Division).[19] All buses and division facilities, even those used by contractors, are owned by the MTS.

MTS serves San Diego proper and the surrounding East County and South Bay regions, while the North County area is served by the North County Transit District's BREEZE bus system.

Routes
The following tables list the bus routes operated by MTS in San Diego County, .

Fleet

References

External links
MTS bus routes and schedules
NCTD bus routes and schedules

Bus routes
San Diego routes
San Diego
Bus routes
Bus routes
Bus routes